Taluqan,, is a district of Takhar Province, in northeastern Afghanistan. The city has a total population of 258,219 (2015) and has 6 Police districts (nahias). The total land area of the city is 10,744 Hectares while there are a total of 28,691 total number of dwellings.

Taluqan is a trading and transit hub in northern Afghanistan. Although agriculture is the majority of land (55%), there are also 28,691 residential houses. Almost half the residential dwellings are concentrated in District 6. The Khanabad River flows through Taluqan and accounts for 7% of total land use.

See also 
 Taloqan
 Districts of Afghanistan
 Takhar Province

References 

Districts of Takhar Province